Following is a list of senators of Loiret, people who have represented the department of Loiret in the Senate of France.

Third Republic

Senators for Loiret under the French Third Republic were:

 Antoine Dumesnil (1876-1888)
 Henry Jahan (1876-1879)
 Paul-Alexandre Robert de Massy (1879-1888)
 Louis Adolphe Cochery (1888-1900)
 Ernest Fousset (1888-1900)
 Albert Viger (1900-1920)
 Gustave Alasseur (1900-1906)
 Ernest Guingand (1906-1920)
 Marcel Donon (1920-1940)
 Fernand Rabier (1920-1933)
 Henri Roy (1920-1940)
 Eugène Turbat (1933-1940)

Fourth Republic

Senators for Loiret under the French Fourth Republic were:

 Jules Delmas (1946-1948)
 Pierre de Félice (1946-1951)
 Claude Lemaitre-Basset (1948-1955)
 Lucien Perdereau (1951-1959)
 Maurice Charpentier (1955-1959)

Fifth Republic 
Senators for Loiret under the French Fifth Republic:

References

Sources

 
Lists of members of the Senate (France) by department